Aspilia elegans is a species of flowering plants in the family Asteraceae. The type specimen was collected in Fouta Djalon Hollande tossekre, Guinea.

Note : Aspilia elegans (Gardner) Benth. & Hook.f. and Aspilia elegans (Gardner) Benth. & Hook.f. ex B.D.Jacks. are synonyms of Aspilia foliacea (Spreng.) Baker. Aspilia elegans (Gardner) Hook.f. & Hook.f. is an unresolved name.

References 

 Tropical African Flowering Plants: Ecology and Distribution. Jean-Pierre Lebrun and Adélaïde L. Stork

External links 
 Aspilia elegans at The Plant List
 Aspilia elegans at science.mnhn.fr (French)

Heliantheae
Flora of Guinea